Koziki may refer to:
Koziki, Podlaskie Voivodeship (north-east Poland)
Koziki, Warmian-Masurian Voivodeship (north Poland)

See also
Kojiki, an ancient Japanese book